F-Zero is a futuristic racing video game franchise originally created by Nintendo EAD and has been continually published by Nintendo although the company has let outside development houses work on some installments. An original installment appeared on every succeeding Nintendo video game console with the exception of the Game Boy Color from its debut until 2004. GP Legend marked the first time the franchise hit a gaming system twice in its lifetime in the United States. The 2004 release of Climax was the last video game in the franchise before its hiatus. Since then, multiple video games were re-released through Nintendo's digital distribution channels. The series currently includes eight released video games, a television series, and video game soundtracks released on audio CDs.

Gameplay consists of racing in futuristic hovercraft and using their speed-boosting abilities to navigate through the courses as quickly as possible in settings like the recurring Mute City, Big Blue and Port Town. The first game was labeled by critics as an influential video game that created the futuristic racing subgenre as well as inspired the creation of numerous racing games such as Daytona USA and the Wipeout series. The series casually centers around the F-Zero racer Captain Falcon and his talented racing and bounty hunting abilities as well as his encounters with the other F-Zero characters.

Video games

Other media

Soundtracks

References
Notes

Citations

Bibliography
 Summary History of F-Zero at IGN. Last accessed on February 17, 2007.

Media lists by video games franchise
Media
Mass media by franchise
Nintendo-related lists